Port Heiden Airport  is a state-owned public-use airport located six nautical miles (7 mi, 11 km) northeast of the central business district of Port Heiden, in the Lake and Peninsula Borough of the U.S. state of Alaska.  Scheduled airline service to King Salmon Airport is provided by Peninsula Airways (PenAir).

As per Federal Aviation Administration records, the airport had 919 passenger boardings (enplanements) in calendar year 2008, 964 enplanements in 2009, and 1,037 in 2010. It is included in the National Plan of Integrated Airport Systems for 2011–2015, which categorized it as a general aviation facility (the commercial service category requires at least 2,500 enplanements per year).

History
Originally opened as Fort Morrow Army Airfield, the facility was closed after World War II and returned to civilian status. Beginning in 1958 the airport was used to support Port Heiden Air Force Station, a Cold War United States Air Force Distant Early Warning Line radar station. The station was operated by Detachment 5, 714th Aircraft Control and Warning Squadron based at Cold Bay Air Force Station, near Cold Bay. The radar station was inactivated in September 1969, ending military use of the airport.

The Air Force remediated the radar site around 2000, removing all abandoned military structures and returning the site to a natural condition.

Facilities and aircraft 
Port Heiden Airport covers an area of 3,500 acres (1,416 ha) at an elevation of 95 feet (29 m) above mean sea level. It has two runways with gravel surfaces: 5/23 is 5,000 by 100 feet (1,524 x 30 m) and 13/31 is 4,000 by 100 feet (1,219 x 30 m).

For the 12-month period ending December 31, 2005, the airport had 1,000 aircraft operations, an average of 83 per month: 50% air taxi and 50% general aviation.

Airlines and destinations

Incidents 
 On April 30, 2008, a Cessna Citation Excel business jet veered off the gravel runway 23 upon landing in a crosswind. The plane sustained substantial damage, thought there were no injuries among the six occupants.

References

External links 
 FAA Alaska airport diagram (GIF)
 Topographic map from USGS The National Map
 

Airports in Lake and Peninsula Borough, Alaska